= Cimburk Castle =

Castle in the Czech Republic

Coordinates: 49.1037°N 17.2162°E

Cimburk Castle is a castle located in the Czech Republic. It was built between 1320 and the 1330s. Štěpán of Vartnov repaired the castle's damage in 1468. Josef Schwoy described the castle in 1793. Conservation work began in the early 1900s.

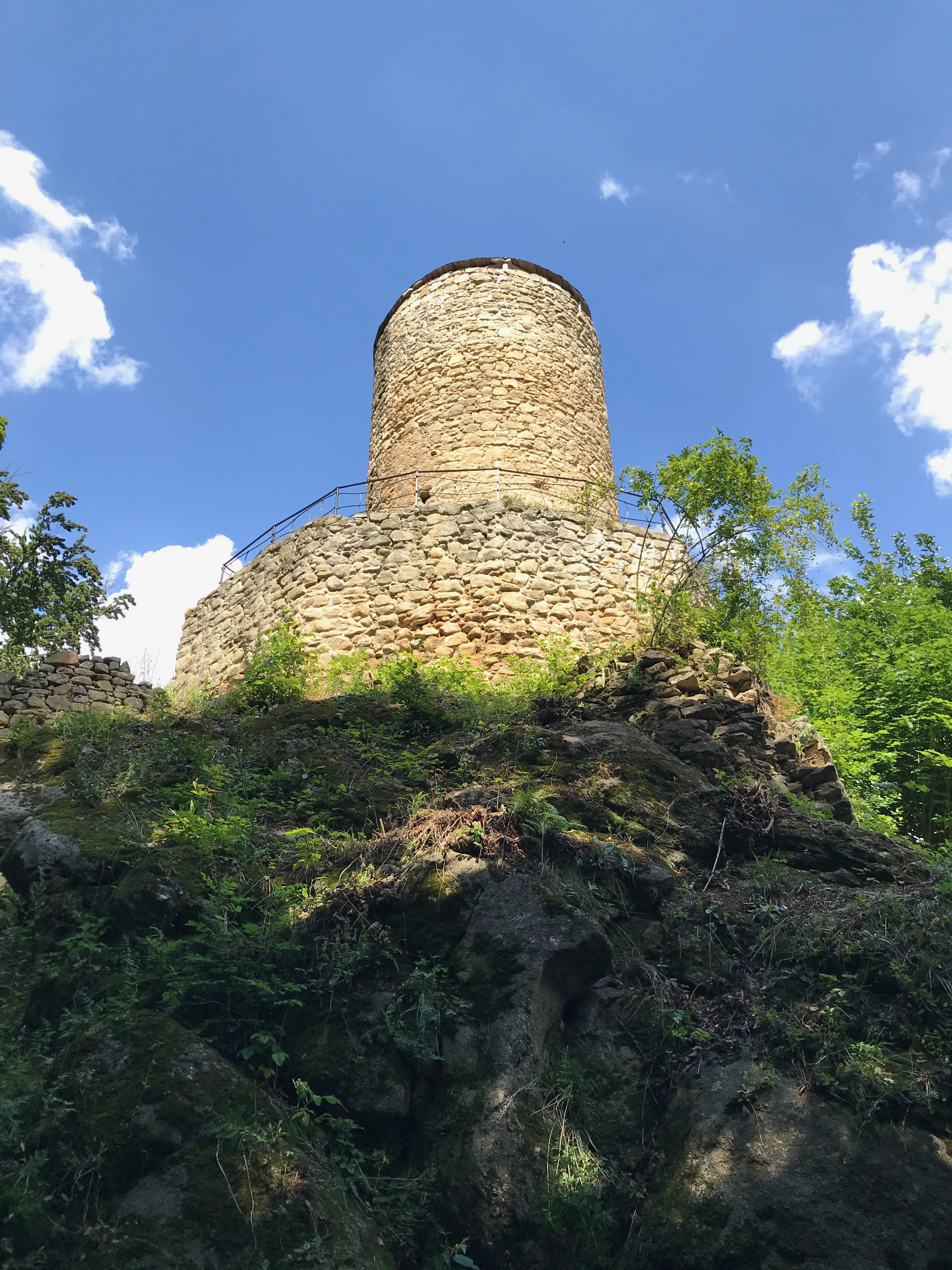
Tower at Cimburk Castle

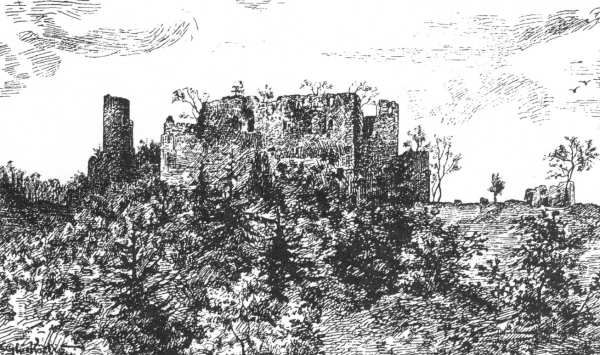
Cimburk u Koryčan, 1884

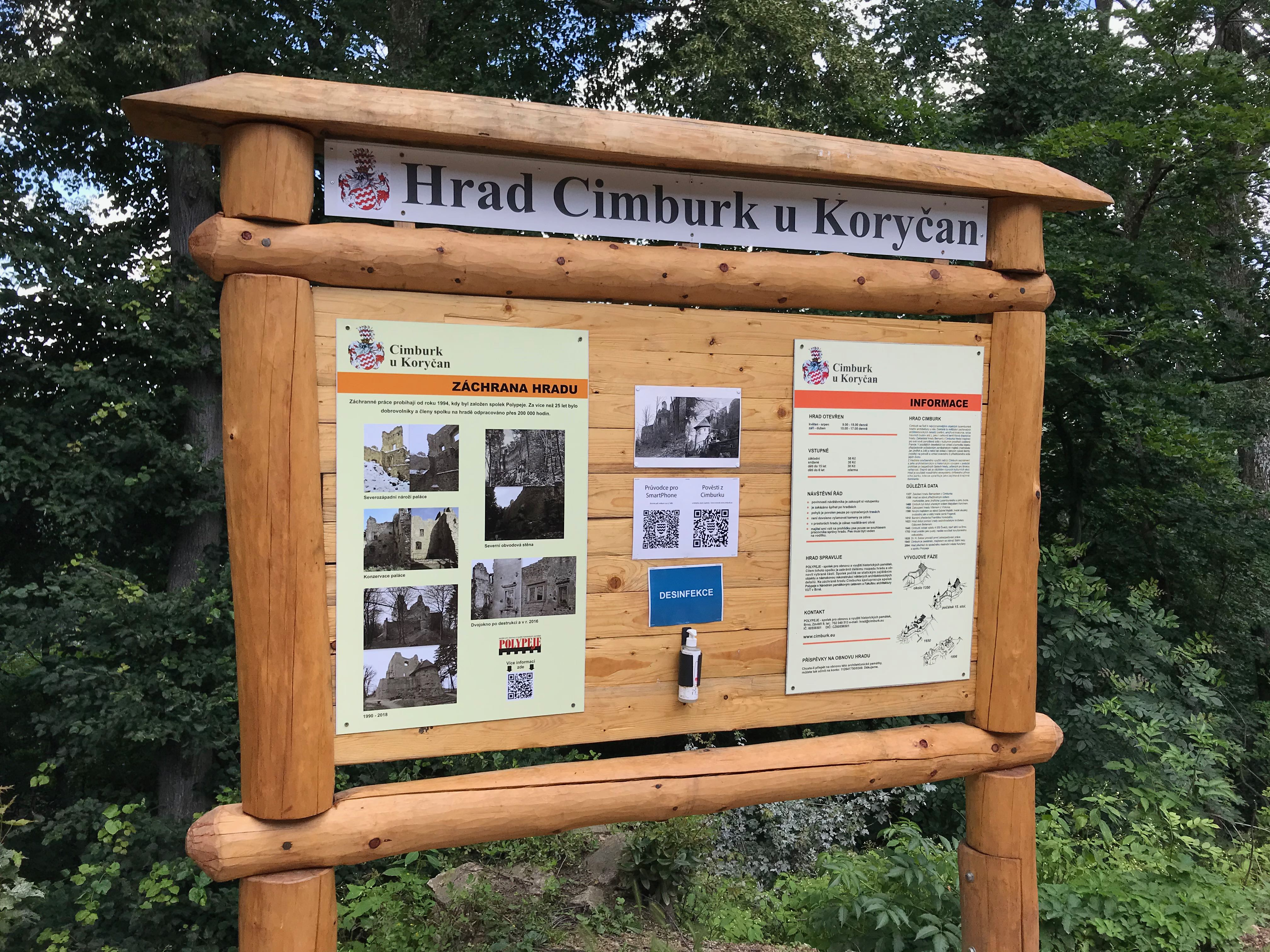
Sign at Cimburk Castle
